Sadhan Chandra Mahavidyalaya, established in 2007, is an undergraduate college in Harindanga, West Bengal, India. This college is affiliated to the University of Calcutta.

Departments

Arts
Bengali
English
Sanskrit
History
Geography
Political Science
Philosophy
Education

Accreditation
Sadhan Chandra Mahavidyalaya is recognized by the University Grants Commission (UGC).

See also 
List of colleges affiliated to the University of Calcutta
Education in India
Education in West Bengal

References

External links
Official website

Educational institutions established in 2007
University of Calcutta affiliates
Universities and colleges in South 24 Parganas district
2007 establishments in West Bengal